Hans Rasmus Astrup (17 April 1831 in Bolsøy – 19 February 1898) was a Norwegian industrial entrepreneur, philanthropist and politician with the Liberal Party.

Astrup was born and raised at Bolsøy in Møre og Romsdal, Norway. He was the son of Ebbe Carsten Tønder Astrup, who was mayor of Bolsøy for four years. He apprenticed as an office boy and salesman for Hans Clausen, who was a ship owner and fish exporter. In 1855, Astrup established his own import business. The trade expanded from fish to lumber, with suppliers in Finland and Sweden and markets in Great Britain. In 1860, he established his office in Stockholm. The business expanded until a fire in 1874. The loss, reconstruction and subsequent economic downturn made the following years to a struggle. In 1885, Astrup signed a sales contract with Swedish company Stora Kopparberg  (now Stora Enso and returned to Norway.

Astrup entered the cabinbet of Norwegian Prime Minister Johan Sverdrup in 1885.  He was Minister of Labour 1885–1887, and member of the Council of State Division in Stockholm 1887–1888. He resigned in 1888. He served in the Norwegian Parliament from Kristiansund 1889-1891 and 1895–1897.

In 1884 he was a co-founder of the Norwegian Association for Women's Rights.

References

1831 births
1898 deaths
Government ministers of Norway
Norwegian Association for Women's Rights people